Pattison may refer to:

Pattison, Mississippi, an unincorporated community, US
Pattison, Texas, a city, US
NRG Station, a subway station on the Broad Street Line in Philadelphia, Pennsylvania once known as Pattison Station.
Pattison (surname), people with the surname Pattison
USS William J. Pattison (DE-594), a United States Navy destroyer escort converted during construction into the high-speed transport USS William J. Pattison (APD-104)
USS William J. Pattison (APD-104), a United States Navy high-speed transport in commission from 1945 to 1946
Pattison College, an independent school in the east of Coventry, England
Pattison's Whisky, a blended scotch whisky
Pattison Outdoor Advertising, a Canadian billboard advertising company

See also
Patterson (surname)
Paterson (disambiguation)
Pattinson, surname